Allyson Anne Estess (born July 1, 1981) is an American former soccer player who played primarily as a defender or midfielder, making four appearances for the United States women's national team.

Career
Marquand played for the University Trojans in high school, where she was a Parade and NSCAA High-School All-American in 1999. She also competed in cross country and track and field, earning her the Irvine World News Athlete of the Year award, and played club soccer for Mission Viejo Soccer Club Mirage. In college, Marquand played for the Stanford Cardinal from 1999 to 2003, where she was a letter-winner. She redshirted in the 2000 season due to a torn ACL. She was included in the NSCAA All-West Region second team in 2003, and was included in the All-Pac-10 first team in 2003, as well as the second team in 1999, 2001, and 2002. Marquand was an honorable mention for the All-Academic Pac-10 selection in 2001, 2002, and 2003. In total, she scored 15 goals and recorded 7 assists in 80 appearances for Stanford.

Marquand played for the under-18/19 and under-21 national teams, winning the 2001 and 2003 Nordic Cup titles with the latter. She made her international debut for the United States on March 7, 2001 in a friendly match against Italy. In total, she made four appearances for the U.S. and scored 1 goal, earning her final cap on March 17, 2001 in the 2001 Algarve Cup against Norway, with her scoring in the 3–4 loss.

Personal life
Marquand is a native of Irvine, California, and works as an orthopedic surgeon specializing in sports medicine. She currently resides in Hermosa Beach, California, with her husband and two children. In 2015 and 2016, she worked as a team physician for the United States women's national under-20 soccer team.

Career statistics

International

International goals

References

1981 births
Living people
Sportspeople from Irvine, California
Soccer players from California
American women's soccer players
United States women's international soccer players
Women's association football defenders
Women's association football midfielders
Women's association football forwards
Stanford Cardinal women's soccer players
American orthopedic surgeons
21st-century surgeons
Women surgeons
21st-century American women physicians
21st-century American physicians
American sports physicians
Physicians from California